Beat Ganz (born 29 April 1946) is a Swiss modern pentathlete. He competed at the 1972 Summer Olympics.

References

External links
 

1946 births
Living people
Swiss male modern pentathletes
Olympic modern pentathletes of Switzerland
Modern pentathletes at the 1972 Summer Olympics